Paul Duqueylar, a French historical painter, born at Digne in 1771, was a student of David. Most of the subjects painted by him are taken from the classic poets and ancient historians, and are of an elevated character. The Judgment of Minos, and Belisarius, both painted at Rome in 1804, are described by Kotzebue in his Souvenirs d'ltalie. He died in 1845.

References
 

1771 births
1845 deaths
18th-century French painters
French male painters
19th-century French painters
People from Digne-les-Bains
Pupils of Jacques-Louis David
19th-century painters of historical subjects
18th-century French male artists